An induction cut, also referred to as a  mighty fine, is the shortest possible hairstyle without shaving the head with a razor.  The style is so named as it is traditionally the first haircut given to new male recruits during initial entry into many of the world's armed forces, but most particularly in the United States.

Purposes 
The induction haircut has both practical and psychological purposes.  Originally, one of the reasons for the induction haircut was to reduce the chances of disease among closely quartered recruits from different geographical areas (with varying immunities), such as head lice. The haircut also has the psychological purpose of stripping recruits of their individuality and promoting the "team" mentality desirable in a platoon of military recruits.

For U.S. male recruits, the induction haircut has become a sometimes-dreaded symbolic rite of passage for entry into the armed forces and is usually performed within minutes or hours of arrival at boot camp.  It is one of several techniques used to mentally shock recruits into adapting to their decision to become a member of the armed forces.  Although all branches of the U.S. armed forces employ the tradition of the induction haircut, the U.S. Marines have adopted the most severe version – a "zero-length" clipper blade to the scalp, although not shorter to avoid any minor injuries to recruits' head moles or other lesions.

Some Army drill sergeants have referred to this cut as the Mighty Fine. Other names for this  haircut are the "buzz cut" or a "number zero", "on the floor" and "the Army's #1 haircut".

Women and the induction cut 
Although the term "induction cut" is generally used to refer to male military haircuts, women also receive a form of an induction haircut, in that their hair may be trimmed to chin-length.  The concept of an "induction haircut" has also been the focus of litigation, such as in the case of The Citadel where attorneys for the first female cadet, Shannon Faulkner, argued that the "knob haircut" (referring to the college's freshman class's traditional nickname) would "implement rules which altogether denigrate Ms. Faulkner's identity as a woman."

The buzz cut 
A buzz cut is any hairstyle where the hair is cut short to a consistent length all over using clippers. The induction cut is distinguishable by the clippers being used without any guard or attachment, resulting in the shortest possible cut. The scalp is not shaved with a razor, but only very short stubble is left. Some people may refer to this haircut as a number 0.

As with many other short hairstyles, including a shaved head, the induction cut is becoming increasingly popular as an everyday hairstyle. It is one of the hairstyles that balding men often choose.

In the French Foreign Legion this form of haircut, used by all recruits and many légionnaires, is termed boule à zéro (zero ball). In recent years, the U.S. military style of high and tight has also become popular in the Légion.

See also
 List of hairstyles

References 

Hairstyles
Military life

External links

1970s fashion
1980s fashion
1990s fashion
Gothic fashion
Punk fashion
Japanese fashion